Bắc Giang station is a railway station in Vietnam. It serves the town of Bắc Giang, in Bắc Giang Province.

References

Buildings and structures in Bắc Giang province
Railway stations in Vietnam